Hiri was (now defunct) a business focused desktop e-mail client for sending and receiving e-mails, managing calendars, contacts, and tasks. It was developed as an alternative to existing e-mail clients and calendar applications such as Microsoft Outlook and Mozilla Thunderbird.

Although Hiri was developed actively with many releases in primarily 2017 and the first half of 2018, there have been no new releases and no active development anymore since August 2018. Also, Hiri Suggestions, a dedicated subdomain for acquiring new ideas for development, has not received replies from the development since last year.

Hiri uses the cross-platform Qt framework to run on Windows, macOS and Linux. Hiri does not support IMAP and only uses Microsoft Exchange Server infrastructure.

Hiri has been funded by Telefonica, Delta Partners, ACT Venture Capital, Enterprise Ireland and Angel investors Facebook and LinkedIn.

In March 2017, Hiri began charging a subscription service ($39 yearly; $119 lifetime).

Features 
 E-mail synchronization using Microsoft Exchange Web Services (EWS) API
 Compatible with Exchange 2010 SP2+ and Office 365
 Full-featured calendar
 Local SQLite database for fast searching of emails
 Exchange Global Address List (GAL)
 Integrated task manager
 Folder management
 Conversation view
 Automatic categorization of emails into Actionable and FYI inboxes
 OAuth 2.0 authentication
 Corporate SSO providers (such as Okta)
 Anonymously rate the quality of emails that you receive

Supported email providers 
Hiri supports in-house corporate Microsoft Exchange servers as well as Office 365, Outlook.com, Live.com, and Hotmail.com.

External links

References 

Email clients
Email clients that use Qt
Windows email clients
MacOS email clients
Email client software for Linux
Proprietary software for Linux
Proprietary software that uses Qt